Mount Leinster Rangers GAA is a Gaelic Athletic Association club located in Borris, County Carlow, Ireland. The club was founded in 1987 and fields teams in both Gaelic football and hurling.

History
Mount Leinster Rangers GAA club was founded in 1987 and the amalgamation of three existing club teams—Borris, Ballymurphy and Rathanna—within the parish was completed in 1988.

On 1 December 2013, Mount Leinster Rangers won their first ever Leinster Senior Club Hurling Championship title after an 0–11 to 0–8 win against Oulart the Ballagh in the final.

Tom Mullally managed the club's hurling team to that Leinster title and to the final of the 2013–14 All-Ireland Senior Club Hurling Championship.

Honours
 Carlow Senior Hurling Championship (9): 2006, 2007, 2009, 2011, 2012, 2013, 2017, 2018, 2020
 Leinster Senior Club Hurling Championship (1): 2013
 All-Ireland Senior Club Hurling Championship Runners-up 2014
 All-Ireland Intermediate Club Hurling Championship (1): 2012
 Leinster Intermediate Club Hurling Championship (1): 2011

References

External links
 Mount Leinster Rangers GAA site

Gaelic games clubs in County Carlow
Hurling clubs in County Carlow
Gaelic football clubs in County Carlow